Barry ‘Bunny’ Reilly (24 March 1948 – 5 May 2021) was an Australian rugby league footballer who played in the 1960s and 1970s.

Career

He played in the NSWRFL Premiership for the Eastern Suburbs Roosters from 1966–71 and 1973–79, and the Cronulla-Sutherland Sharks in 1972.

Reilly was also known as 'The Axe’ because of his defensive technique, which it was said allowed him to chop down opposition attackers like an axe. Reilly was a member of the Eastern Suburbs premiership-winning sides in 1974 and 1975. During the 1976 NSWRFL season, Reilly played as a prop forward for Eastern Suburbs in their unofficial 1976 World Club Challenge match against British champions St. Helens in Sydney.

Also a backrower, Reilly played almost 200 matches for the Roosters and was named as a bench player in that club's ’Team Of The Century’.

During the 1990 season, Reilly helped out the club as a caretaker coach.

Reilly died on 5 May 2021 from kidney failure.

References

External links
The Encyclopedia Of Rugby League Players; Alan Whiticker & Glen Hudson

1948 births
2021 deaths
Australian rugby league players
Cronulla-Sutherland Sharks players
Rugby league players from Queensland
Sydney Roosters coaches
Sydney Roosters players
People from Warwick, Queensland